Hungary competed at the 1908 Summer Olympics in London, England. Austria and Hungary had separate NOCs, therefore results at Olympic Games are kept separate despite the union of the two nations as Austria-Hungary at the time.


Medalists

| width=78% align=left valign=top |

Default sort order: Medal, Date, Name
| style="text-align:left; width:22%; vertical-align:top;"|

Multiple medalists
The following competitors won multiple medals at the 1908 Olympic Games.

Competitors

| width=78% align=left valign=top |

The following is the list of number of competitors participating in the Games:

| width="22%" style="text-align:left; vertical-align:top" |

The following is the list of dates, when Hungary won medals:

Results by event

Athletics

Hungary's best athletics result was István Somodi's silver medal in the high jump.  The Hungarian medley relay team took the bronze medal.

Fencing

Hungary dominated the sabre competitions, taking the top two individual medals and the team gold.

Gymnastics

Rowing

Shooting

Swimming

Tennis

Wrestling

Notes

Sources
 
 

Nations at the 1908 Summer Olympics
1908
Olympics